Flexopecten is a genus of saltwater scallops, marine bivalve mollusks in the family Pectinidae, the scallops.

Species
Species and subspecies within the genus Flexopecten include:
 
 Flexopecten felipponei (Dall, 1922)
 Flexopecten flexuosus (Poli, 1795)
 Flexopecten glaber (Linnaeus, 1758)
 Flexopecten glaber ponticus (Bucquoy, Dautzenberg & Dollfus, 1889)
 Flexopecten hyalinus (Poli, 1795)

Synonyms:
 Flexopecten coarctatus (Born, 1778) = Flexopecten flexuosus (Poli, 1795)
 Flexopecten glaber glaber (Linnaeus, 1758) = Flexopecten glaber (Linnaeus, 1758)
 Flexopecten glaber proteus (Dillwyn, 1817) = Flexopecten glaber (Linnaeus, 1758)
 Flexopecten ponticus = Flexopecten glaber ponticus (Bucquoy, Dautzenberg & Dollfus, 1889)
 Flexopecten proteus (Dillwyn, 1817) = Flexopecten glaber'' (Linnaeus, 1758)

References

 WoRMS info on the genus

Pectinidae
Bivalve genera